WMOX (1010 AM) is a radio station broadcasting in the Meridian, Mississippi, Arbitron market. The station carried a News/Talk format, featuring personalities such as Rush Limbaugh, Dave Ramsey, and Laura Ingraham.

The station's license was cancelled by the Federal Communications Commission on June 2, 2020 for failure to file a license renewal application. The license was reinstated on August 6.

External links
 Official website
 
 
 

Talk radio stations in the United States
MOX
Radio stations established in 1946